Andrea Hollander  (born April 28, 1947 in Berlin, Germany) is an American poet. Her most recent poetry collection is Blue Mistaken for Sky (Autumn House Press, 2018). Her work has appeared in New Ohio Review, Poetry, The Georgia Review, The Gettysburg Review, New Letters, FIELD, Five Points, Shenandoah, and Creative Nonfiction. She was raised in Colorado, Texas, New York, and New Jersey, and educated at Boston University and the University of Colorado. From 1991 till 2013, Hollander was writer-in-residence at Lyon College. She was married from 1976 to 2011. Hollander lives in Portland, Oregon, where she teaches writing workshops at The Attic Institute for Arts and Letters and at Mountain Writers Series.

Awards
 2014 Oregon Literary Fellowship
 2008 Subiaco Award for Literary Merit for Excellence in the Writing and Teaching of Poetry.
 2007 National Endowment for the Arts Fellowship
 1993 Nicholas Roerich Poetry Prize, for House Without a Dreamer
 1992 Porter Prize
 1991 National Endowment for the Arts Fellowship
 D. H. Lawrence Fellowship
 Runes Poetry Award
 Arkansas Arts Council fellowships

Published works
Full-length poetry collections

 Blue Mistaken for Sky. Autumn House Press. 2018. ISBN 978-1-938769-33-7.
 
 
 
 
  Chapbook

Anthologies edited
 

Anthology publications

Reviews
Utterly of-the-moment and thoroughly inclusive, When She Named Fire, in step with this historical importance, will hold the attention of even the most well read of interested poetry connoisseurs: even those already well-acquainted with women writers in particular.

See also
 Doren Robbins

References

External links
Andrea Hollander's website
"Wound", Able Muse
"Exchange Student"; "Beginning and Ending with Lines from Shakespeare"; "In the Sixth Year of My Father’s Illness", "Poem in October"; "The Other Life", Poetry Magazine
corlandreview.com, "What I Need It For"; "What It Is"; August 1999
"Delta Flight 1152"; "Wound", The Drunken Boat
"For Weeks After the Funeral", Poetry Foundation 

1947 births
Living people
American women poets
Boston University alumni
National Endowment for the Arts Fellows
University of Colorado alumni
Poets from Arkansas
People from Mountain View, Arkansas
21st-century American women